The Merrymeeting River is a  river in the Lakes Region of central New Hampshire in the United States. It is a tributary of Lake Winnipesaukee, part of the Merrimack River watershed.

The river begins at the outlet of Merrymeeting Lake in the town of New Durham. The river flows south through a chain of ponds to the village proper of New Durham. After passing under New Hampshire Route 11, the river enters Merrymeeting Marsh and turns sharply to the northwest, the course it will take the rest of the way to its end. The river crosses a small dam at Alton and reaches Lake Winnipesaukee at the community of Alton Bay, the southernmost point on the lake.

See also

List of rivers of New Hampshire

References

Tributaries of the Merrimack River
Rivers of New Hampshire
Rivers of Strafford County, New Hampshire
Rivers of Belknap County, New Hampshire